The State Treasury Agency of the Republic of Azerbaijan operating under Ministry of Finance is a state body that is accountable for provision of payment of budget revenues into the budget implementation of state budget cash, targeted use of expenditures in accordance with single budget classification. The agency utilizes the treasury single account (TSA) while implementing the mentioned financial operations. The agency implements the first step of an audit. It acts in accordance with Constitution of the Republic of Azerbaijan, decisions and orders of the Cabinet of the Republic of Azerbaijan, as well as international treaties ratified by the Republic of Azerbaijan and Statute on the State Treasury Agency of the Ministry of Finance of the Republic of Azerbaijan. All casts of the agency related to its activities are funded from the state budget of the Republic of Azerbaijan and other sources determined by the legislation.

History 
The statute of State Treasury Agency of the Republic of Azerbaijan was approved on 9 February 2009 according to the Presidential Decree No.48.

Activities 
State Treasury Agency of the Republic of Azerbaijan has authority to participate in the preparation process of state budget indices and also controlling this process. Within its authority it also implements financial transactions and planning for the purpose of maintaining the efficiency and transparency for the administration of state budget entities. The agency tend to ensure that budget revenues entering the state budget and costs of the state budget are implemented accordingly based on a single budget classification. It implements preliminary state (budget) commitments on goods and services purchased by the budgetary organizations, and according to these commitments it fulfills the repayment of the debts arising from the mentioned purchases.

Structure 
The agency is headed by a director appointed and dismissed by the Minister of Finance of the Republic of Azerbaijan. He is directly responsible to carry out all duties that entrusted to him. The director has two deputies that are appointed or dismissed by the Minister of Finance.

The director has the following authorities and responsibilities;

 Organizing the activities of the Agency;
 Appointing and dismissing the personnel of the Agency, expect for the deputies of the director, heads of structural divisions of the Agency's and the heads of Agency's Regional bodies.
 Giving orders (that are considered mandatory to implement) to the organizations that are subordinate to him within his authorities;
 Providing the Ministry of Finance of the Republic of Azerbaijan with reports on the Agency's activities;
 Carrying out other tasks in accordance with the legislation of the Republic of Azerbaijan.

References

External links 
 State Treasury Agency of the Republic of Azerbaijan

Government agencies of Azerbaijan
Government agencies established in 2009